New York's 30th State Assembly district is one of the 150 districts in the New York State Assembly in the United States. It has been represented by Democrat Steven Raga since 2023, replacing Brian Barnwell.

Geography

2020s 
Due to the growing Asian population on Elmhurst, Jackson Heights, and Woodside, the new 30th district was drawn to be an Asian majority district, comprising the neighborhoods of Woodside, Elmhurst, and portions of Maspeth, Astoria, Jackson Heights, and Middle Village.

2010s 
District 30 is located in Queens, comprising parts of the neighborhoods of Woodside, Maspeth, Astoria, Dutch Kills, Middle Village, Elmhurst, and Sunnyside.

Recent election results

2022

2020

2018

2016

2014

2012

References 

30
Queens, New York